Alix MacDonald is a Canadian TV producer, writer, and director who is primarily known for work in factual television. MacDonald has been nominated for and won several television awards. She is best known for her Canadian Screen Award winning show, Disasters at Sea.

Career
MacDonald studied arts at the University of Toronto. She began her career in the early 1990s with CTV News. In the mid-1990s, she transitioned to factual television by joining Daily Planet as a producer. Since then, MacDonald has produced numerous Canadian factual television programs.

Awards

Television

References

Canadian women television producers
Canadian television producers
Living people
University of Toronto alumni
Year of birth missing (living people)